James Hampton Anderson is a Kenan Professor in the computer science department of the University of North Carolina at Chapel Hill. He was named a Fellow of the Institute of Electrical and Electronics Engineers (IEEE) in 2012 "for contributions to the implementation of soft-real-time systems on multiprocessor and multicore platforms", and a Fellow of the Association for Computing Machinery in 2013.

References 

American computer scientists
University of North Carolina at Chapel Hill faculty
Fellows of the Association for Computing Machinery
Fellow Members of the IEEE
Living people
Year of birth missing (living people)
American electrical engineers